Etmopterus bullisi, sometimes called the lined lanternshark, is a shark of the family Etmopteridae found in the western Atlantic from North Carolina to northern Florida, and Honduras, between latitudes 34°N and 15°N, at depths of up to 850 m.  Its maximum length is more than 26 cm, but an adult has yet to be measured.

References

 
 Compagno, Dando, & Fowler, Sharks of the World, Princeton University Press, New Jersey 2005 

lined lanternshark
Fauna of the Southeastern United States
Fish of the Caribbean
lined lanternshark
Taxa named by Henry Bryant Bigelow
Taxa named by William Charles Schroeder